Player of the Week may refer to:
 AT&T ESPN All-America Player, in college football
 Euroleague Player of the Week
 FedEx Air & Ground NFL Players of the Week
 Major League Baseball Player of the Week Award
 NWSL Player of the Week